Super World of Sports, more commonly known as SWS, was a Japanese professional wrestling promotion from 1990 to 1992. Its motto was "Straight and Strong".

History

Formation
In April 1990, Genichiro Tenryu, one of the top stars of All Japan Pro Wrestling, left the company to become a spokesmodel for Megane Super, whom were one of the best-known makers of eyeglasses in Japan at the time. However, the company decided to instead used him as the launching pad for a new pro-wrestling circuit, which Megane Super executive Hachiro Tanaka named Super World of Sports.

With his backing, Megane Super began throwing money offers around to build up their roster. Yoshiaki Yatsu, Ashura Hara, Shunji Takano, The Great Kabuki, Hiromichi Fuyuki, Tatsumi "Koki" Kitahara, Masao Orihara, Isao Takagi (the future Arashi), and referee Hiroyuki Umino joined in from All-Japan. But SWS would attract New Japan Pro-Wrestling talent as well, including George Takano (the former Cobra), Naoki Sano, Hisakatsu Oya, Akira Katayama, former superstar yokozuna (grand champion in sumo wrestling) Koji Kitao, and Stampede Wrestling powerhouse Dino Ventura  (605 lb bench press) who had extraordinary MMA and technical wrestling skills. Because of this, fans, wrestlers, and administrators of other Japanese promotions criticized SWS as being a "money puroresu" (Megane Super being the money mark) because of the way wrestlers flocked to it. The feeling was compounded when in October, SWS signed a working relationship contract with Vince McMahon's World Wrestling Federation, for interpromotional purposes.

Working relationship with the WWF
The SWS/WWF co-promotion produced several cards, including two shows at the Tokyo Dome. The events took place on March 30, 1991, and December 12, 1991 (The March show saw a near-shoot between former sumos Kitao and Earthquake; Kitao was fired for subsequently cutting a shoot promo exposing the business afterwards). SWS also had a small agreement with two smaller Japanese federations, Gran Hamada's Universal Lucha Libre and Yoshiaki Fujiwara's Fujiwara Gumi (shoot-style wrestling), which provided alternative matches and opponents to the cards.

SWS's peak coincided with the general Japanese economic downturn of the early 1990s. As Megane Super began withdrawing its support, the company began running fewer cards, and in May 1992 Yatsu withdrew. On June 19 1992, SWS held its final card at Nagasaki International Gym. The promotion's talent split into the following federations: Yatsu's SPWF; Tenryu's new promotion, WAR, including Hara, Fuyuki, Kitahara; NOW, including Kendo Nagasaki, and PWC, including the Takano brothers and Takagi.

Wrestlers

Main roster
Unlike many wrestling promotions, SWS had a wrestling roster that was divided into three stables, reminiscent of the sumo heya system. Revolution was mostly AJPW alumni, Palaestra was mostly NJPW alumni, and Geki Dojo were neutrals led by a heel manager, KY Wakamatsu.

Revolution
Genichiro Tenryu, leader
The Great Kabuki
Koji Kitao
Ashura Hara
Takashi Ishikawa
Samson Fuyuki
Tatsumi Kitahara
Masao Orihara
Nobukazu Hirai
Toshiyuki Nakahara
Yuji Yasuraoka

Geki Dojo
KY Wakamatsu, leader
Kendo Nagasaki
Yoshiaki Yatsu
Goro Tsurumi
Shinichi Nakano
Isao Takagi
Koji Ishinriki
Hiroshi Hatanaka
Hikaru Kawabata
Tetsuya Yamanaka

Palaestra
George Takano, leader
Shunji Takano
Naoki Sano
Kenichi Oya
Apollo Sugawara
Fumihiro Niikura
Akira Katayama
Don Arakawa

Visiting wrestlers

World Wrestling Federation
Randy Savage
The Brooklyn Brawler
The Bushwhackers (Luke and Butch)
The Fabulous Rougeau Brothers (Jacques and Raymond)
Greg Valentine
Ted DiBiase
The Rockers (Shawn Michaels and Marty Jannetty)
Boris Zhukov
Koko B. Ware
King Haku
Tito Santana
Jimmy Snuka
The Warlord
The Barbarian
The Hart Foundation (Bret Hart and Jim Neidhart)
Earthquake
Demolition (Smash and Crush)
Hacksaw Jim Duggan
The Ultimate Warrior
Sgt. Slaughter
The Texas Tornado
Mr. Perfect
The Road Warriors
Hulk Hogan
Tugboat / Typhoon
Power and Glory (Paul Roma and Hercules)
Paul Diamond
Pat Tanaka
Rick Martel
The British Bulldog
The Berzerker
The Undertaker
The Beverly Brothers (Beau and Blake)
Ric Flair
Jim Powers
Giant Kimala

Foreign freelancers

United States
Killer Tim Brooks
Chavo Guerrero Sr.
Jeff Jarrett
Kenny The Striker
Bob Orton Jr.
Rochester Roadblock
Chris Walker (wrestler)
Jeff Wheeler
Snake Williams

Canada
Giant Goliath
Dino Ventura

Mexico
El Dandy
Atlantis
Bestia Salvaje
Emilio Charles Jr.
Jerry Estrada
Comando Ruso
Blue Panther
El Satanico
Guerrero El Futuro
Arkangel de la Muerte

Other
Kato Kung Lee (Panama)
Chris Adams (England)
Gerry Morrow (Martinique)
The Samoan Swat Team (Samoan Savage and Fatu) (Samoa)

Guests from other Japanese promotions

Pro Wrestling Fujiwara Gumi
Masakatsu Funaki
Yoshiaki Fujiwara
Minoru Suzuki
Wellington Wilkins Jr.
Jerry Flynn

Universal Lucha Libre/Federación Universal de Lucha Libre
Gran Hamada
Yoshihiro Asai/Ultimo Dragon
Punish/Coolie S.Z.
Crush/Bulldog K.T.

SWS championships
SWS never had a Heavyweight Championship.

SWS Junior Heavyweight Championship

SWS Tag Team Championship

See also

Professional wrestling in Japan
List of professional wrestling promotions in Japan

References

External links
Wrestling-Titles.com: Super World Sports

Japanese professional wrestling promotions
Entertainment companies established in 1990
1990 establishments in Japan
Entertainment companies disestablished in 1992
1992 disestablishments in Japan